Sam Jones is a fictional character who debuted on the American television sitcom The Andy Griffith Show (1960–1968). Jones then went on to star in the spin-off show Mayberry R.F.D.. Jones is portrayed by American actor Ken Berry.

Overview
Sam lives in the fictional community of Mayberry, North Carolina. He is a farmer and lives outside of town. He does not appear in The Andy Griffith Show until the final four episodes of the final season when he is elected to the town council. He appeared in all 78 episodes of Mayberry R. F. D.

Aunt Bee moves in with Sam and his young son Mike following Sheriff Andy Taylor's marriage to Helen Crump. Aunt Bee stays with Sam through the beginning of the Mayberry R.F.D. series, but eventually she moves away and is replaced by Cousin Alice (Alice Ghostley).

References

 The Andy Griffith Show: The Complete Series. Paramount, 2007.
 Kelly, Richard. The Andy Griffith Show. Blair, 1984.

The Andy Griffith Show characters
Fictional characters from North Carolina
Television characters introduced in 1968